Sho' Nuff is a slang expression meaning "sure enough", as expressed in African American Vernacular English. It was widely used in blues music, sometimes as an interjection.

Sho' Nuff can also refer to:
 Sho'nuff (character), the Shogun of Harlem, from Berry Gordy's The Last Dragon
 Sho-Nuff , funk band. Malaco Records
 Sho'nuff Records, an Atlanta-based record company
 Sho' Nuff (album), a 1998 box set release from The Black Crowes
 "Sho Nuff" (song), a 1996 song by Tela
 "Sho' Nuff", a 1973 song by Sly, Slick & Wicked
 "Sho Nuff", a B-side of Fatboy Slim's 1999 single "Praise You"
 "Sho-Nuff", a song by KC & The Sunshine Band from their 1978 album Who Do Ya (Love)

See also
Sure 'Nuff, 1970 album by Sonny Phillips
"Sure Enough" a 1996 song by Chris Cummings